Symon Gabriel da Silva (born July 25, 1990) is a Brazilian football player.

References

1990 births
Living people
Brazilian footballers
J2 League players
FC Gifu players
Brazilian football managers
Association football midfielders
Sportspeople from Campinas